Jim, the Conqueror is a 1926 American silent Western film directed by George B. Seitz and starring William Boyd and Elinor Fair.

Cast

Preservation
A print of Jim, the Conqueror survives in the French archive Centre national du cinéma et de l'image animée in Fort de Bois-d'Arcy, and a negative may be in the Library of Congress.

References

External links
 
 

1926 films
1926 lost films
1926 Western (genre) films
Films directed by George B. Seitz
American black-and-white films
Lost Western (genre) films
Lost American films
Producers Distributing Corporation films
Silent American Western (genre) films
1920s American films